Maxim Recruitment Ltd is a British recruitment agency headquartered in Leicester, Leicestershire, England with associated offices located in Toronto, Canada, Hong Kong and Dubai. Maxim is an engineering, construction and property sector recruitment consultancy that finds jobs for people across the UK and internationally in locations all over the world.
 
It works with job seekers and employers with links to construction industry bodies such as the RICS, HKIS, ICES, CIOB, APM, and the ICE.

History
Founded and launched in January 2003 by Steve Thomas and Mark Guthrie, Maxim Recruitment was owned by Steve Thomas 2005-2010 and jointly owned by Steve Thomas and Richard Poulter from 2010 onwards.

The business reports that they register hundreds of specialist technical professional construction industry job vacancies every month and hold a database of over 40,000 qualified job seekers that are often not available through any other recruitment or advertising source.

References

External links
Official Website
Job Offers Site

Business services companies established in 2003
Employment agencies of the United Kingdom
British companies established in 2003